Pseudobistonidae is a family of Asian moths in the superfamily Geometroidea. It was erected in 2015 and contained Pseudobiston pinratanai as its only species. A second species was moved into this family in 2019: Heracula discivitta, in a new subfamily called Heraculinae.

Subfamilies and genera
 Subfamily Pseudobistoninae Minet, Rajaei & Stüning, 2015
 Genus Pseudobiston Inoue, 1994
 Subfamily Heraculinae Wang & Holloway, 2019
 Genus Heracula Moore, [1866]

References

 
Moth families